No. 115 Helicopter Unit (Hovering Angels) is a Helicopter Unit and is equipped with HAL Dhruv and based at Tezpur Air Force Station.

History
President of India awarded Standards to 115 Helicopter Unit of Indian Air Force at Tezpur, Assam on 21 November 2014.

Assignments

The unit took part in Indo-Pakistani war of 1971 and cyclone relief operations in Andhra Pradesh and Odisha in May 1979 and Super Cyclone in 1999.

Aircraft
HAL Dhruv

References

115